was a Japanese painter and founder of the Hasegawa school.

He is considered one of the great painters of the Azuchi–Momoyama period (1573-1603), and he is best known for his  folding screens, such as Pine Trees and Pine Tree and Flowering Plants (both registered National Treasures), or the paintings in walls and sliding doors at Chishaku-in, attributed to him and his son (also National Treasures).

Biography
 
 

Hasegawa Tōhaku, born  in 1539 in Nanao, a town in Noto Province (in the vicinity of present-day Ishikawa Prefecture) to a noted local family of cloth dyers, although evidence shows that Tōhaku's original family name was Okumura and that he was adopted into the Hasegawa family.

Tōhaku started his artistic career as a painter of Buddhist paintings in his home province of Noto. By the age of 20 Tōhaku was a professional painter, and by his thirties had moved to Kyoto to study under the prestigious Kanō school, then headed by Kanō Shōei. The Kanō school was well known at the time for their large bold paintings that decorated the castle walls of many a wealthy warlord patron. These were often ink on white paper or gold-leaf decorative wall panels that served a dual purpose of reflecting light around the dim castle rooms as well as flaunting the castle owner's abundant wealth to commission such extravagant pieces. Many of Tōhaku's earlier works are in the style of the Kanō school, such as his Maple, Chishaku-in painted in 1593.

At the same time he also studied the older Song, Yuan and Muromachi periods' styles of ink painting by examining scrolls from Mu Qi and Sesshū Tōyō, which he is believed to have gained access to in his time at the Daitoku-ji temple in Kyoto. The works of Sesshū Tōyō in particular influenced Tōhaku's redirection of artistic style as Tōhaku also studied under Sesshū's successor, Toshun for some time. Tōhaku was in fact so much enamored with the techniques of Sesshū that he attempted to claim rights as his fifth successor, though he lost in a court battle to Unkoku Togan. Still, the influence of Sesshū is evident in many of Tōhaku's mid to late works, such as his , which were declared a national treasure of Japan are argued to be the first paintings of their scale to depict only pine trees as subject matter.

The school founded by Hasegawa Tōhaku is known today as the Hasegawa school. This school was small, consisting mostly of Tōhaku and his sons. However small, its members conserved Tōhaku's quiet and reserved aesthetic, which many attribute to the influence of Sesshū as well as his contemporary and friend, Sen no Rikyū. It is suspected that these simple aesthetics protested the usage of intimidation and wealth rampant in the Kanō school.

Tōhaku's most noted contemporary was Kanō Eitoku, who often competed with Tōhaku for the patronage of Toyotomi Hideyoshi. After Eitoku's death in 1590, Tōhaku stood alone as the greatest living master of his time. He became the official painter for Hideyoshi, and produced some of his greatest and most elegant paintings under his patronage. He and his atelier produced the wall and screen paintings in Shoun-ji (temple), commissioned by Toyotomi Hideyoshi in 1593. The paintings were moved to Chishaku-in (temple), Kyoto and have survived. There he stayed for the remainder of his life.

References

External links

 The painting Old Trees and Monkeys   at the Kyoto National Museum.
Momoyama, Japanese Art in the Age of Grandeur, an exhibition catalog from The Metropolitan Museum of Art (fully available online as PDF), which contains material on Hasegawa Tōhaku.

1539 births
1610 deaths
Japanese painters
Buddhist artists